Gogolewo may refer to the following places:
Gogolewo, Gostyń County in Greater Poland Voivodeship (west-central Poland)
Gogolewo, Śrem County in Greater Poland Voivodeship (west-central Poland)
Gogolewo, Słupsk County in Pomeranian Voivodeship (north Poland)
Gogolewo, Tczew County in Pomeranian Voivodeship (north Poland)
Gogolewo, West Pomeranian Voivodeship (north-west Poland)